Protecta is a technical, political, cultural, social and economic news magazine published bimonthly in Italy.

History and profile
Protecta was first published in March 1987 by Rocco Colomba. The paper is based in Rome, and the editor is Tony Colomba.

Given its format, which includes long essays and articles, the journal tends to cater to an intellectual elite. Many social scientists and men and women of science and other leading figures have written on this paper, including Jacques Barrot, Edward Chaplin, Stavros Dimas, Jacques Diouf, Al Gore, Ban Ki-moon, Kōichirō Matsuura, E. Morley, A. Steiner.

Protecta has an average circulation of 60,000 copies. In 2008, some issues sold more than 100,000 copies.

See also
 List of magazines in Italy

References

External links
 Protecta

1987 establishments in Italy
Cultural magazines
Bi-monthly magazines published in Italy
Italian-language magazines
News magazines published in Italy
Political magazines published in Italy
Magazines established in 1987
Magazines published in Rome